Msheireb Tram is a transport network in Msheireb Downtown of Doha. The Tram network is a single 2 km, closed-loop track system that includes nine stops, making it easier for visitors to access all parts of the city district. The network uses three hydrogen vehicles. The Msheireb Tram interconnects the entirety of Msheireb Downtown Doha, running along a two-kilometre closed loop track that takes roughly 18 minutes to complete. The network is served by a fleet of three hydrogen vehicles provided by TIG/m, United States. Built at the TIG/m facility in California, the cars are air-conditioned and feature light-filtering glass panels that reduce the sun's heat effect by 90 percent.

Station 
 Sahat Al Nakheel Station
 Wadi Msheireb Station
 Galleria Station
 Msheireb Prayer Ground Station
 Heritage Quarter Station
 Al Baraha Station
 Sahat Al-Masjid Station
 Al Kahraba Street Station
 Al Mariah Street Station

References

Doha
2019 establishments in Qatar
Rail transport in Qatar